The Betbeder Islands are a group of small islands and rocks in the southwest part of the Wilhelm Archipelago,  west of Cape Tuxen. They were discovered by the French Antarctic Expedition, 1903–05, and named by Jean-Baptiste Charcot for Rear Admiral Onofre Betbeder, Argentine Navy.

See also 
 List of Antarctic and sub-Antarctic islands

References
 

Islands of the Wilhelm Archipelago